Dennis Mepham is a retired American soccer defender who played professionally in the North American Soccer League, American Soccer League, United Soccer League and Major Indoor Soccer League

Youth
Mepham attended Brighton High School where he was an outstanding basketball and soccer player.  He then attended Bowling Green State University, where he played basketball for two years and soccer for four.  When he graduated, he held the team record for both career and single season scoring with 25 and 11 goals respectively.  He graduated with a bachelor's degree in finance in 1980 and was inducted into the BGSU Athletic Hall of Fame in 1986.

Professional
The Rochester Lancers of the North American Soccer League drafted Mepham in 1980.  The Lancers folded at the end of the season and he signed with the Buffalo Stallions of the Major Indoor Soccer League in the fall of 1980.  He returned to the outdoor game in 1981 with the Rochester Flash of American Soccer League.  That season, he was a first team All Star.  He continued to play for the Flash through the 1983 season.  At the end of the season, both the Flash and the league collapsed.  In 1984, he played for the Buffalo Storm of the United Soccer League.  In August 1984, the Stallions sold Mepham's contract to the Cleveland Force.  He was a regular with the Force until the 1987-1988 season when he suffered from a hairline fracture to his leg bone.  In June 1988, the Force released Mepham after he refused to take a 25% reduction in pay.  Mepham then went into the real estate business in Cleveland.  In the summer of 1989, he signed with the expansion Cleveland Crunch.  The Crunch released Mepham in June 1990.  He retired from playing professionally that summer.

Yearly Awards
1981 ASL All-Star Team

1983 MISL All-Star Team

References

External links
NASL/MISL stats

1958 births
American soccer players
American Soccer League (1933–1983) players
Buffalo Stallions players
Buffalo Storm players
Bowling Green Falcons men's soccer players
Cleveland Force (original MISL) players
Cleveland Crunch (original MISL) players
Major Indoor Soccer League (1978–1992) players
North American Soccer League (1968–1984) players
Rochester Lancers (1967–1980) players
Rochester Flash players
United Soccer League (1984–85) players
Living people
Association football defenders
Soccer players from New York (state)
Bowling Green Falcons men's basketball players